The Chief of the Air and Space Force Staff (CEMAAE) is the military head of the French Air and Space Force. The chief directs the air and space force staff and acts as the principal advisor to the Chief of the Defence Staff on subjects concerning the Air and Space Force. As such, they ensure the operational preparedness of their service branch, express their need for military and civilian personnel, and are responsible for maintaining the discipline, morale and conduct of their troops. Special responsibilities can be assigned to them in relation to nuclear safety.

The chief does not have a fixed term, nor an attached rank. In practice, however, a term has never exceeded five years and all chiefs since the late 1940s have been five–stars generals (OF–09). They are assisted in their duties by the Major General of the Air and Space Force who will deputise if needed.

The current chief, General Stéphane Mille, has been serving since 10th September 2021.

History

Interwar 
The office was officially created in December 1928 in the 1929 Law of Finances. It proposed the creation of a high command for the Military Aeronautics, still under the authority of the Army, which would succeed the function of the Direction of Military Aeronautics. The French Air Force became independent in 1934, and the Chief obtained full authority.

World War II 
After the armistice, Germany imposed severe restrictions on the size of the French Air Force. As a result, the scope of authority of the Chief was limited, and the office was ultimately eliminated alongside the Air Force.

Postwar 
Free France and the subsequent governments of the re-established French Republic recreated the office at the end of the war.

Office holders

Third Republic

French State

Provisional Government

Fourth Republic

Fifth Republic

Free France 
From its creation in 1940 to the final integration of its air force to the regular French Air Force, Free France had its own staff, based in London. The Free French Aerial Forces were headed by a Commander, responsible to the Commander-in-Chief of the Free French Forces, and was assisted by a Chief of the General Staff.

Commanders of the Free French Aerial Forces

Chiefs of the General Staff

See also 
Chief of the Defence Staff
Chief of Staff of the French Army
Chief of Staff of the French Navy
Special Operations Command
Directorate General of the National Gendarmerie
Strategic Air Forces Command

References

Notes 

 *
French Air and Space Force
French military staff
France